Héctor Moni (7 February 1936 – 22 August 2022) was an Argentine rower. He competed in the men's coxless four event at the 1960 Summer Olympics.

Moni died on 22 August 2022.

References

1936 births
2022 deaths
Argentine male rowers
Olympic rowers of Argentina
Rowers at the 1960 Summer Olympics
Sportspeople from Rosario, Santa Fe
Pan American Games medalists in rowing
Pan American Games silver medalists for Argentina
Pan American Games bronze medalists for Argentina
Rowers at the 1959 Pan American Games